Justin Paul Hollis Shekoski (born June 11, 1983) is an American guitarist, songwriter, and vocalist, best known for being the former lead guitarist, songwriter, and backing vocalist of Saosin and The Used. He has cited guitarists John Petrucci and Paul Gilbert as some of his main inspirations. Shekoski is also known for his guitar playing style onstage, including "guitar spins," which involves spinning his guitar over his left shoulder multiple times, subsequently catching it mid-air, and continuing to play.

Career 
Shekoski, along with Beau Burchell, Anthony Green, and Zach Kennedy, is a founding member of the post-hardcore band Saosin, having been with the group since their 2003 extended play Translating the Name. In February 2015, Quinn Allman, the lead guitarist for post-hardcore band The Used, began a year-long hiatus from performing with the group, and Shekoski was selected to fill in for him. The Used bassist Jeph Howard cited their friendship with the entirety of Saosin and Shekoski specifically as the reasons he was selected. In November 2015, The Used announced that Allman would be permanently leaving the band, and that Shekoski would be replacing him as an official member.

Shortly after that announcement, Shekoski revealed that he had been removed from Saosin "a few months [prior to November 2015]" for what he described as "questionable reasons". Shekoski expressed surprise at his removal, saying "One thing I can be sure of is that I could not and would not have done anything differently over the past years. The shows were some of the best we have ever played. It truly seemed as if everyone was happy and positivity was at an all-time high. I was proud of the new music we were creating and to be turned away right before we tracked the record that we had spent years writing and our entire career working towards is saddening at best and angering at worst. If anyone's heart or commitment to Saosin could have possibly been in question, it certainly wasn't mine, ever."

In January 2018, following a business dispute regarding payment after the release of The Canyon and subsequent promotional tour, Shekoski was dismissed from the band.  In March 2018, The Used removed Justin Shekoski from their band members section on Facebook and edited him out of their promotional photos. On May 4, 2018, gossip reports surfaced of the remaining members of the Used filing a restraining order against Shekoski alleging "violence against us and himself." The story alleged that Shekoski stated that "retaliation is the only way to get justice. Those fucks ruined my life and stole my creative work." The report also alleged that Shekoski sent text messages to The Used with threats of suicide by hanging at one of their shows, to which the band responded, "Even and especially in the toughest times, the threat of suicide should never be taken lightly." Following a hearing in August 2018, the judge rejected the band's request to make the order permanent citing a lack of evidence. Shekoski's attorney issued a statement stating, "the failed move for a permanent restraining order was nothing more than a ruse" to cheat his client out of royalties for the band's album, The Canyon.

Shekoski received critical acclaim for his work on The Canyon by the Alternative Press, stating "[Shekoski] has breathed new life into the songwriting." Other various music critics positively praised The Canyon for its unique sound with Billboard stating the album was The Used's most prolific and most important to date.

In 2019, Shekoski filed suit against The Used for royalties and damages. The dispute was resolved amicably and settled out of court.

Discography 
with Saosin
 Translating the Name (2003)
 Saosin (2005)
 Saosin (2006)
 Come Close (2006)
 The Grey (2008)
 In Search of Solid Ground (2009)

with The Used
 Live & Acoustic at the Palace (2015)
 The Canyon (2017)

References

External links 

 

1983 births
Living people
Musicians from Orange County, California
American male guitarists
The Used members
People from Orange County, California
American alternative rock musicians
American rock songwriters
American rock guitarists
Guitarists from California
21st-century American guitarists
21st-century American male musicians